Boris Mikhailovich Donskoy (1894 – 10 August 1918) was a Russian Empire terrorist-revolutionary. He was a member of the Left Socialist-Revolutionary party as SR-maximalist. Donskoy became widely known for his assassination of German Field Marshal and military governor of Ukraine Hermann von Eichhorn in summer of 1918.

Biography

Early life
Boris was born in a village of Gladkie Vyselki, Mikhailovsk uyezd (county), Ryazan Governorate in a peasant family of Russian Orthodox Old Believers. After finishing at village school Donskoy went to Saint Petersburg to seek employment at age 15. In 1915, during the First World War, he was mobilized into the Imperial Russian Army and Donskoy was placed onto a transport ship "Asia" in the Baltic Fleet.

Revolutionary Activities
In 1916 Donskoy joined the Left Socialist-Revolutionary Party and soon after that he was arrested for organizing a hunger strike and anti-government propaganda. Right after the February Revolution of 1917 Donskoy was released and elected to the Executive Committee of Kronshtadt.

During the July Days, Donskoy at early hours of July 17 called to the leader of the Left Socialist-Revolutionaries in the Tauride Palace to discuss the organization of the military protest and later announced it at the Kronshtadt City Council. Along with Nikolai Rivkin, Donskoy led a combined squat of Baltic sailors against the Kornilov's protest. During the October Revolution Boris Donskoy was a commissar at the Fort Ino, just outside Saint Petersburg, from where he directed military formations to the Pulkovo Heights.

In spring of 1918 along with Irina Kakhovskaya he went to Ukraine, particularly to the newly established Donetsk–Kryvyi Rih Soviet Republic to prepare for fight against the Imperial German occupation. In April 1918 Donskoy joined the All-Russian Battle Organization of the Left Socialist-Revolutionaries that was sanctioned by its party to carry out an "international terror".

Assassination of Field Marshall Hermann von Eichhorn
In Kyiv, together with Irina Kakhovskaya and G.Smolyansky, Donskoy prepared for an assassination attempt on the commander of the German military governor of Ukraine, Field Marshal Hermann von Eichhorn. On July 30, 1918 he threw a bomb at the Field Marshal who soon died along with his adjutant Captain von Dressler.
Donskoy was caught right at the crime scene and was interrogated. He stated that Eichhorn was sentenced by the Left Socialist Revolutionary Party as the commander of the German military forces who "strangled" the "revolution" in Ukraine, changed a political system, carried out a takeover as a supporter of the middle and upper class to bring to power the Hetman of Ukraine and confiscated land from peasants. Donskoy was convicted by a field military court to a death sentence through hanging and was publicly executed on August 10, 1918.

See also
February Revolution
Hermann von Eichhorn
Left Socialist Revolutionaries

External links
 Volkovynsky, V. "The loudest terrorist act in the period of the Ukrainian Revolution" (НАЙГУЧНІШИЙ ТЕРОРИСТИЧНИЙ АКТ ПЕРІОДУ УКРАЇНСЬКОЇ РЕВОЛЮЦІЇ). Mirror Weekly. Kiev. 2001-02-03.
 EICHHORN HIT WHILE DRIVING (original text). The New York Times. Amsterdam. 1918-07-31.
 EICHHORN HIT WHILE DRIVING (abstract). The New York Times. Amsterdam. 1918-07-31.

1894 births
1918 deaths
People from Ryazan Oblast
People from Mikhaylovsky Uyezd
Left socialist-revolutionaries
Revolutionaries from the Russian Empire
Assassins from the Russian Empire
Executed Russian people
Executed assassins
People executed by Germany by hanging
Executed people from Ryazan Oblast